The United States Court of Appeals for the First Circuit (in case citations, 1st Cir.) is a federal court with appellate jurisdiction over the district courts in the following districts:

  District of Maine
  District of Massachusetts
  District of New Hampshire
  District of Puerto Rico
  District of Rhode Island

The court is based at the John Joseph Moakley Federal Courthouse in Boston, Massachusetts. Most sittings are held in Boston, where the court usually sits for one week most months of the year; in one of July or August, it takes a summer break and does not sit. The First Circuit also sits for one week each March and November at the Jose V. Toledo Federal Building and United States Courthouse in Old San Juan, Puerto Rico, and occasionally sits at other locations within the circuit.

With six active judges and four active senior judges, the First Circuit has the fewest judges of any of the thirteen United States courts of appeals.  Since retiring from the United States Supreme Court, Associate Justice David Souter occasionally sits on the First Circuit by designation.

Current composition of the court 

:

Vacancies and pending nominations

List of former judges

Chief judges

Succession of seats

Notable decisions 
West v. Randall (1820), one of the first decisions setting precedent for class action suits

See also 
 Courts of the United States
 Judicial appointment history for United States federal courts#First Circuit
 List of current United States Circuit Judges
 List of United States federal courthouses in the First Circuit

References 
Specific

General

External links 
 United States Court of Appeals for the First Circuit
 Recent opinions from Findlaw
 First Circuit Court Records Finder

 

 
1891 establishments in the United States
Courts and tribunals established in 1891